Intergalactic Thanksgiving, sometimes known as Please Don't Eat The Planet, is a 1979 Canadian Thanksgiving animated television special that premiered on CBC and in the United States in syndication on November 22, 1979. Intergalactic Thanksgiving was the fourth television special produced by Nelvana in their 1977 to 1980 series of specials, A Cosmic Christmas, The Devil and Daniel Mouse and Romie-0 and Julie-8, all premiering in 1977, 1978 and 1979.

The story revolves around farmers and aliens who try to get along after a serious ecological accident happens. The ranchers help the royal family of the planet Laffalot from their runaway foodmaking machine.

The special has been included on several Nelvana compilations, such as Animated Ink from 1980 and Nelvanamation (Volume 1), also from 1980.

Plot

Cast
The voice cast included:
 King Goochie: Sid Caesar
 Ma Spademinder: Catherine O'Hara
 Pa Spademinder: Chris Wiggins
 Victoria Spademinder: Jean Walker
 Magic Mirror: Martin Lavut
 Notfunnyenuf: Derek McGrath
 The Bug: Al Waxman
 Bug Kid/Cromwell: Toby Waxman

References

1979 animated films
1979 films
1979 television films
1979 television specials
Canadian animated television films
Thanksgiving television specials
Canadian television specials
Nelvana television specials
1970s Canadian films